The year 1802 in architecture involved some significant events.

Buildings and structures

Buildings

 New Satu Mare Chain Church in Romania, designed by Preinlich Sigismund, is completed.
 New St. George's Church, Dublin, Ireland, designed by Francis Johnston, is completed.
 The Temple of Saint Philip Neri in Guadalajara, Jalisco, Mexico is completed.
 The Four Courts in Dublin, designed by James Gandon, is completed.
 Rebuilding of Liverpool Town Hall in England under the direction of John Foster is completed.
 The Classen Library in Copenhagen, Denmark, designed by the benefactor Peter Hersleb Classen, presumably assisted by Andreas Kirkerup, is completed.
 Wildersgade Barracks in Copenhagen, designed by the architects and developers Jørgen Henrich Rawert and Andreas Hallander, is opened.
 Mežotne Palace in Latvia, designed by Johann Georg Adam Berlitz, is completed.
 Badenich Palace in Bejsce, Poland, designed by Jakub Kubicki, is built.
 Sedgeley, a mansion on the Schuylkill River near Philadelphia designed by Benjamin Henry Latrobe, is completed.
 Wrangel Palace in Stockholm, Sweden is rebuilt after a fire by Carl Christoffer Gjörwell.
 New dining room and conservatory for the Royal Pavilion, Brighton, England, designed by Peter Frederick Robinson, are completed.
 Monument to the Magdeburg Rights (Kiev) in Ukraine, designed by Andrey Melensky, is erected.

Awards
 Grand Prix de Rome, architecture: Hubert Rohault de Fleury.

Births
 January 22 – Richard Upjohn, English-born ecclesiastical architect working in the United States (died 1878)
 August 22 – Félix Marie Charles Texier, French architect and antiquary (died 1871)
 August 26 – George Wightwick, Welsh-born architect working in south west England and pioneer architectural journalist (died 1872)
 October 6 – James Bunstone Bunning, English architect (died 1863)

 Stamatios Kleanthis, Greek architect (died 1862)
 Andrei Stackenschneider, Russian architect (died 1865)
 Ernst Friedrich Zwirner, Silesian-born architect working in Germany (died 1861)

Deaths
 July 17 – , French architect (born 1710)
 John Whitehead, English amateur architect working in Portugal (born 1726)

References

Architecture
Years in architecture
19th-century architecture